Constructive journalism is a domain within journalism that is grounded within academia
and involves the field of communication that is based around reporting solution-focused news, instead of revolving only around negative and conflict-based stories. The idea behind constructive journalism is to give stories more context and make the consumer of the news more informed by portraying the world more accurately by adding nuances, context, progress and solutions. By giving more background and also reporting what is going well, so that people are more able to create a realistic view of the world. Instead of only reporting the issues, some practitioners of constructive journalism also addresses what the consumer can do with the information, such as how they might take action on the issue. The domain should be seen as an umbrella where different experimentation takes place, from more classic, conservative applications to more progressive and experimental applications often seen in newer newsrooms like De Correspondent, (NL) or Correctiv (DE).  

The journalist does not reflect his or her opinion and also does not render or implement what those solutions are, but tries to inform the society of what solutions there might be. Pioneers of constructive journalism say that as a journalist you have a big impact on the way people think, because of the way you construct the news. Journalists need to be aware of that responsibility more by being more careful in the way they construct their stories. They think that many journalist, who use a very cynical way of reporting the news, forget that by reporting everything that is going wrong from a distance, they also move the society. 

It aims to avoid a negativity bias and incorporates findings from positive psychology research to produce novel frameworks for journalism.
Therefore, instead of solely reporting on conflicts and problems, constructive journalism aims to gain a more comprehensive portrayal of the issues at hand. 
It aims to expose core causes of problems but also to report on emerging ideas and developments to shift society towards more impartial and sustainable paths. 
Constructive journalism aims to express how change is possible and highlights the role each member of society may play to foster it. Additionally, it strives to strengthen the ethics code of journalism by avoiding the distortion of information in order to provide a more real portrayal of the world. Constructive journalism attempts to create an engaging narrative that is factually correct without exaggerating numbers or realities.

The world's first Ph.D. dissertation on constructive journalism was completed at the School of Journalism and Mass Communication at the University of North Carolina, Chapel Hill, in 2015, by Karen McIntyre.

Applications 

According to the Danish journalist Cathrine Gyldensted, the Canadian family systems therapist Karl Tomm's four types of therapeutic questioning can be adopted into an interview approach that can also be used by journalists. Tomm's original framework provides four types of questions a therapist can use in psychotherapy sessions to bring about positive therapeutic outcomes from clients. By using the same model in journalism, similarly constructive answers could be obtained from the interviewee.

In what he named the "interventive interviewing" devised to facilitate positive changes in family dynamics, Tomm divides questions into four types based on two intersecting dimensions that make up four quadrants. The first dimension of intentionality differentiates between "orienting questions" that help interviewers (therapists) orient their views about the interviewees (clients) and "influencing questions" that challenge the interviewees' (clients') understanding of themselves. When used outside psychotherapy, such as in journalism, this dimension of intentionality is also interpreted as the temporal dichotomy between past-orientation and future-orientation.  The second dimension of linear vs. circular assumptions, theoretically based on Gregory Bateson's works on the nature of mind, differentiates between lineal assumptions that take a reductionist, deterministic approach and circular assumptions that take a holistic, systemic approach. The resulting four types of questions are:
 Linear Questions ("The Detective"): Basic investigative questions that deal with "Who did what?, Where?, When?, and Why?". This type of questions helps discover the factual aspect of the problem or issue.
 Circular Questions ("The Anthropologist"): This type of questions discovers relevant contextual perspective behind the facts. Examples: "How did this affect you (or other things/people/etc.)?" and "What is your explanation for A or B?".
 Reflexive Questions ("The Future Scientist"): In reflective questions, the interviewer suggests a new perspective on a given topic, thereby nudging the interviewee to reflect on a new possibility of constructive solutions to the problem or issue. Examples: "What do you think A believes, when he is in that situation?", "How would you approach this problem?", and "What action should be taken in order to do A or B?"
 Strategic Questions ("The Captain"): Directs the interviewee into commitment of the solution. Examples: "What should be done?", "Will you do it?", and "When will you do it?"

Gyldensted reports that conventional journalists tend to be past-oriented and hence leave out future-oriented questions, especially the "Future Scientist". For example, in a four-hour press conference with a former Danish prime minister, the press asked 59% "Detective", 19.4% "Captain", 18.7% "Anthropologist", and only 3% "Future Scientist" questions out of a total of more than 130 questions. "As a consequence," she writes, "[journalists] miss out on asking questions that explore new perspectives, solutions and visions, and on triggering actions based on those perspectives." An ideal, constructive interview requires a balance among all four types of questions, because "[a]n interview containing all four roles of questioning [...] reveals the problem and the involved parties (Detective), provides reflection on what has happened (Anthropologist), points towards a solution or maps a bigger vision (Future Scientist), and commits decision-makers (Captain)." These four types of questions, being grounded in family therapy, is especially effective in political journalism, because the interviewer can encourage "mediation in political debates" and hence facilitate constructive collaboration among politicians.

Media corporations working with constructive journalism 

In Scandinavia this domain has been evolving since 2007. In December 2007 the editor-in-chief and CEO of Danish media corporation Berlingske Media, Lisbeth Knudsen, wrote an editorial where she reflected on the natural but also detrimental effects of journalism's negativity bias, and called for more positive and constructive story ideas.

Danish public broadcaster DR is working with constructive journalism in their news department, but not only there, also on regional stations like P4 Fyn and DR Danmark.

Danish broadcaster TV 2 News has launched a special format they have coined Yes We Can Stories in their nightly news format.

Sweden's SVT and SR have implemented constructive journalism as part of their everyday method and framework.  Dutch online media outlet De Correspondent in The Netherlands have named a correspondent for progress and a constructive correspondent as part of their newsroom staff.

The Huffington Post launched their special sections experimenting on constructive journalism in 2011 with The Washington Post following in 2014 with an online section labelled "The Optimist".

Belgian national French-speaking media RTBF has launched in late 2012 a monthly magazine in coproduction with 7 local walloon televisions, called "Alors, on change!". Its aim is to make portraits of citizens involved in transition, aiming at giving positive and inspirational examples of behavioral change to viewers.

Spanish B2B digital editorial, https://vol.media/, has recently announced its shift to Constructive Journalism for their new business model, the digital interactive magazine VoL eMag, which focuses in showcasing success stories of initiatives, projects and decisions oriented towards sustainability in the international corporate ecosystem.

See also 
 Solutions journalism

References 

Journalism
Positive psychology
Behavioural sciences